Victor Kristopaitis (September 16, 1935 – January 24, 2020) was a Canadian football player who played for the BC Lions and Toronto Argonauts. He previously played at the University of Dayton.

References

2020 deaths
1935 births
Dayton Flyers football players
Canadian football guards
Canadian football placekickers
American football guards
American football placekickers
Toronto Argonauts players
BC Lions players